Edward Lee Thrasher Jr. (March 7, 1932 – August 5, 2006), known as Ed Thrasher, was an American art director and photographer. He was the recipient of numerous Grammy Award nominations for his work on album covers and won a Grammy for Best Album Package in 1974 for the Mason Proffit cover Come & Gone. He worked with many recording artists, such as Frank Sinatra, Dean Martin and the Beach Boys.

He was born in Glendale, California, to a Los Angeles city councilman. He served in the Navy during the Korean War and in 1957 began working at Capitol Records as an assistant, later becoming art director and photographer. In 1964, he joined Warner Bros. Records, where he designed a number of album covers, including the Jimi Hendrix Experience's Are You Experienced, Van Morrison's Astral Weeks, the Grateful Dead's Anthem of the Sun and the Doobie Brothers' Toulouse Street.

He was married to Linda Gray from 1962 to 1983.

Death 
He died of cancer at the age of 74 at his home in Big Bear Lake, California.

References

External links

Thrasher's photographs at MPTV Images

1932 births
2006 deaths
American graphic designers
20th-century American photographers
People from Glendale, California
Grammy Award winners
United States Navy personnel of the Korean War